Frederikssundbanen is one of six radial S-train lines in Copenhagen; it connects the city center with a number of Northwestern suburbs (notably Herlev and Ballerup) and other townships until Frederikssund on the Western coast of the Nordsjælland peninsula.

Stations

Service patterns 

The service pattern on the inner part of the line is the C service which stops at all stations until Ballerup. On the outer part the basic service is H, which runs partially non-stop until Ballerup. The H service is peculiar in that its frequency is not doubled during daylight hours, as all other basic S-train services are. Instead, in the period where C is doubled, half of its trains continue to Frederikssund, providing 6 trains per hour in total on the outer part of the line, too. This daylight-only extension is indicated as "(C)" in the above table.

Kildedal station is the only officially existing station on the S-train network that is not served for the entire service period, as the only trains that stop there are the daylight C extension. After about 19.00 and on Sundays no trains stop at Kildedal.

History 

The Frederikssund line opened in 1879 as a single-track railway to Frederikssund from Frederiksberg, which at that time was a station on the main line between Copenhagen and Roskilde. In 1911 the main line was moved to connect to the new (current) central station, and the Frederikssund line inside Vanløse was replaced with a connecting line to Valby. The old line between Frederiksberg and Vanløse had a quiet existence until April 3, 1934, when it became part of the first S-train line. Much later this piece of railway metamorphosed again and became part of the Copenhagen metro.

Later in 1934 S-train service was extended westwards from København H until Valby, and in 1941 the section Valby-Vanløse was upgraded to double track and S-train service too. Passengers to stations farther out would ride the S-train to Vanløse and change to steam trains (later diesel) there. In 1949 S-train service was extended to Ballerup, and at the same time the line was double-tracked as far as Herlev. A second track between Herlev and Ballerup was built 1966-1970.

The diesel trains at the outer end of the line were finally replaced by S-trains in 1989. At this time, the line's terminus in Frederikssund was restored to its original central location. It had been moved nearer to the harbour in 1928 in order to connect to the short-lived central Zealand railway and kept its new, somewhat remote, location for more than 50 years after the central Zealand railway closed again in 1936.

After the 1989 electrification, the line beyond Ballerup was kept as a single-track line. Uniquely for an S-train line, several level crossings were retained after the electrification of the Ballerup-Frederikssund part. With fixed train crossings in Veksø and Ølstykke the single track could sustain three trains an hour in each direction, which quickly proved inadequate to keep up with the traffic demands. It took several years before funding for an upgrade could be secured, but a second track between Ballerup and Frederikssund was eventually built as far as Veksø in 2000 and all the way to Frederikssund in 2002. As soon as the new track was ready, the service frequency was doubled to six trains an hour. The double track also allowed new stations to be opened at Kildedal and Gammel Toftegård.

References

S-train (Copenhagen) lines